Finders Keepers is a surviving 1928 silent military-comedy film directed by Wesley Ruggles and ?Otis B. Thayer and starring Laura La Plante and John Harron. It was produced and distributed by Universal Pictures. The film may or may not be a remake of a 1921 film Finders Keepers singularly directed by Thayer.

Cast
Laura La Plante - Barbara Hastings
John Harron - Carter Brooks
Edmund Breese - Colonel Hastings
Eddie Phillips - 2nd Lt. Kenneth Purdy
Arthur Rankin - Pvt. Blondy Jones
Jack Oakie - B.B. Brown
Joseph P. Mack - Chaplain
Edgar Dearing - Seargeant
William Gorman - Bozo
S. May Stone - Mrs. Satterlee

unbilled
Andy Devine - -Doughboy/Gate Guard
Richard "Skeets" Gallagher - Soldier who pursues Blondy

Preservation status
This film is preserved in the Library of Congress from elements preserved and prepared by Universal. Its trailer also exists in the Library of Congress.

References

External links

1928 films
American silent feature films
Universal Pictures films
Films directed by Wesley Ruggles
Films based on short fiction
American black-and-white films
Silent American comedy films
1928 comedy films
Films based on works by Mary Roberts Rinehart
Surviving American silent films
1920s American films